Headquartered in Majorstua borough, Oslo, the Norwegian Motor Trade Association (NBF) is a Norwegian employers' organisation, organized under the national Confederation of Norwegian Enterprise.

It traces its roots back to 1928.

The current CEO is Stig Morten Nilsen. Chairman of the board is Birger Skjellvik.

References

External links
Official site

Employers' organisations in Norway
Organizations established in 1928